The World Giving Index (WGI) is an annual report published by the Charities Aid Foundation, using data gathered by Gallup, and ranks over 140 countries in the world according to how charitable they are. The aim of the World Giving Index is to provide insight into the scope and nature of giving around the world. 
The first edition was released in September 2010. The most recent edition was published in October 2022, with Indonesia, Kenya and the United States of America ranking as the top three. Australia, New Zealand, Myanmar, Sierra Leone, Canada, Zambia, and Ukraine making up the rest of the top ten.

Methodology 

This report is primarily based upon data from the Gallup World Poll, which is an ongoing research project carried out in more than 140 countries that together represent around 95% of the world's adult population (around 5 billion people).
In most countries surveyed, 1,000 questionnaires are completed by a representative sample of individuals living across the country. The coverage area is the entire country, including rural areas. The sampling frame represents the entire civilian, non-institutionalized, aged 15 and older population of the entire country. In some large countries such as China and Russia, samples of at least 2,000 are collected, while in a small number of countries, the poll covers 500 to 1,000 people but still features a representative sample. The survey is not conducted in a limited number of instances, including where the safety of interviewing staff is threatened, scarcely populated islands in some countries, and areas that interviewers can reach only by foot, animal, or small boat.

In all, over 150,000 people were interviewed by Gallup in 2014, and samples are probability-based. Surveys are carried out by telephone or face-to-face depending on the country's telephone coverage.
There is of course a margin of error (the amount of random sampling error) in the results for each country, which is calculated by Gallup around a proportion at the 95% confidence level (the level of confidence that the results are a true reflection of the whole population). The maximum margin of error is calculated assuming a reported percentage of 50% and takes into account the design effect.

Gallup asked people which of the following three charitable acts they had undertaken in the past month:
 helped a stranger, or someone they did not know who needed help
 donated money to a charity
 volunteered their time to an organization

World Giving Index rankings

"n/a" indicates a country was not surveyed for that year's World Giving Index report

Response to the results (2010) 
The Sri Lankan President Mahinda Rajapaksa hailed the results of the Index where Sri Lanka came in 8th.  President Rajapaksa said it captured "the reality of our caring and sharing society".

The President of Taiwan, Ma Ying-jeou described the results as "unfair" and stated that Taiwan had transformed itself from an "importer of love to an exporter of love".

Australian Parliamentary Secretary for Social Inclusion and the Voluntary Sector and Senator for New South Wales, Dr Ursula Stephens said, "I see each day the enormous efforts of our country's five million volunteers and witness the generosity of the millions of Australians whose donations make the work of our non-profit organizations possible. So, this result on the World Giving Index is confirmation of what we already know – we are a country of generous people who are quick to lend a helping hand in times of need."

The Community and Voluntary Sector Minister in New Zealand, Tariana Turia, said, "The report shows that New Zealanders are particularly generous when it comes to giving money and helping strangers, but also in terms of volunteering. As a nation we must celebrate our generosity and make sure that our decisions and our actions bolster it even further."

References

External links 
The World Giving Index 2022 pdf
The World Giving Index 2021 pdf
The World Giving Index 2019 pdf
The World Giving Index 2018 pdf
The World Giving Index 2017 pdf
The World giving Index 2016 pdf
The World giving Index 2015 pdf
The World giving Index 2014 pdf
The World giving Index 2013 pdf
The World giving Index 2012 pdf
The World giving Index 2011 pdf
The World giving Index 2010 pdf
 The World Giving Index Homepage
 The World Giving Index on the Guardian Datablog

International rankings
Charity